Mount Evelyn was a railway station on the Warburton line in Melbourne, Australia.  The station operated from the opening of the line until its closure in 1965. Originally called "Olinda Vale", the station name was changed to "Evelyn" in 1907. The prefix "Mount" was added in 1919, to promote the town's attractions and healthful "mountain" air.

The coming of the railway was an important event in Mount Evelyn's history. Within a year of its opening, the Victorian Railways was offering cheap excursion fares which made the destination very appealing to day-trippers and tourists, especially working class people with limited means for travel. By the 1920s, literally hundreds of excursionists were travelling to Mount Evelyn at weekends and during holiday periods.

The stationmaster's house remains, but has been extensively modified to operate as a community house. The retaining wall of the station platform also exists.

References

External links
Mount Evelyn Railway Station, circa 1920.

Disused railway stations in Melbourne
Railway stations in Australia opened in 1901
Railway stations closed in 1965
1965 disestablishments in Australia